Natural News (formerly NewsTarget, which is now a separate sister site) is a far-right, anti-vaccination conspiracy theory and fake news website known for promoting alternative medicine, pseudoscience, disinformation, and far-right extremism. The website began publishing articles in 2008 and is based in the United States.

The site's founder, Michael Allen "Mike" Adams, gained attention after posting a blog entry implying a call for violence against proponents of GMO foods, and then allegedly creating another website with a list of names of alleged supporters. He has been accused of using "pseudoscience to sell his lies". Adams has described vaccines as "medical child abuse".

The website sells various dietary supplements, promotes alternative medicine and climate change denial, makes tendentious nutrition and health claims, disseminates fake news, and espouses various conspiracy theories and pro-Donald Trump propaganda. These conspiracy theories include chemophobic claims about the purported dangers of "chemtrails", fluoridated drinking water, heavy metals, anti-perspirants, laundry detergent, monosodium glutamate, aspartame, and vaccines. It has also spread  conspiracy theories about the Zika virus allegedly being spread by genetically modified mosquitoes and purported adverse effects of genetically modified crops, as well as the farming practices associated with and foods derived from them.

As of 2014, Natural News had approximately 7 million unique visitors per month.

In May 2020, Facebook banned Natural News content from its platform after discovering that the site was boosting its popularity using content farms in North Macedonia and the Philippines, a form of spamming. Natural News bypassed the ban by republishing its content on a large number of topic-specific domain names, including trump.news, extinction.news, mind.control.news, and veggie.news. The Institute for Strategic Dialogue found 496 domain names associated with Natural News as of June 2020.

Founder 
Michael Allen "Mike" Adams (born 1967 in Lawrence, Kansas) is the founder and owner of Natural News; the domain name was registered in 2005 and began publishing articles in 2008. According to Adams' own website, he became interested in alternative nutrition when he developed type II diabetes at the age of 30 and one of his websites asserts "he cured himself of diabetes in a matter of months and transformed himself into the picture of perfect health in mind, body and spirit" himself using natural remedies. However, The Daily Beast found that his recommendation for Amazon Herb Company products in at least eight articles, including a supposed "third-party review...from a truly independent perspective" turn out to be misleading; he has a financial interest in the company, according to non-profit business records in Arizona. He is a raw foods enthusiast and holistic nutritionist. He claims to eat no processed foods, dairy, sugar, meat from mammals or food products containing additives such as monosodium glutamate (MSG). He also says he avoids use of prescription drugs and visits to Western medical doctors.

Adams has endorsed conspiracy theories surrounding the Deepwater Horizon oil spill, and those involving Malaysia Airlines Flight 370. He has endorsed Burzynski: Cancer Is Serious Business, a movie about Stanislaw Burzynski. Steven Novella characterizes Adams as "a dangerous conspiracy-mongering crank". Adams has also endorsed the books of conspiracy theorist Jim Marrs.

Adams has made music videos expressing similar viewpoints as the articles posted on his website, such as opposition to the swine flu vaccine.

In 2012, after the Sandy Hook Elementary School shooting occurred, Adams called for "medication control" instead of gun control. In March 2018, Adams created Hoggwatch.com, a website Snopes said was "apparently created solely for the purpose of attacking Parkland shooting survivor David Hogg."

Criticism and controversies
Writing in the journal Vaccine, Anna Kata identified Natural News as one of numerous websites spreading "irresponsible health information". According to John Banks, Adams uses "pseudoscience to sell his lies" and is "seen as generally a quack and a shill by science bloggers." One such blogger, David Gorski of ScienceBlogs, called Natural News "one of the most wretched hives of scum and quackery on the Internet," and the most "blatant purveyor of the worst kind of quackery and paranoid anti-physician and anti-medicine conspiracy theories anywhere on the Internet", and a one-stop-shop for "virtually every quackery known to humankind, all slathered with a heaping, helping of unrelenting hostility to science-based medicine and science in general." Peter Bowditch of the website Ratbags commented about the site. Steven Novella of NeuroLogica Blog called NaturalNews "a crank alt med site that promotes every sort of medical nonsense imaginable." Novella continued: "If it is unscientific, antiscientific, conspiracy-mongering, or downright silly, Mike Adams appears to be all for it—whatever sells the "natural" products he hawks on his site."

Individuals who commented about Adams' website include astronomer and blogger Phil Plait, PZ Myers, and Mark Hoofnagle. In 2011 and 2015 Brian Dunning listed NaturalNews.com as #1 on his "Top 10 Worst Anti-Science Websites" lists. Adams is listed as a "promoter of questionable methods" by Quackwatch. Robert T. Carroll at The Skeptic's Dictionary said, "Natural News is not a very good source for information. If you don't trust me on this, go to Respectful Insolence or any of the other bloggers on ScienceBlogs and do a search for "Natural News" or "Mike Adams" (who is Natural News). Hundreds of entries will be found and not one of them will have a good word to say about Mike Adams as a source."

According to The Atlantic, Natural News is one of the most prominent anti-vaccination websites on Facebook. An article in the journal Vaccine said the site "tend(s) to not only spread irresponsible health information in general (e.g. discouraging chemotherapy or radiation for cancer treatment, antiretrovirals for HIV, and insulin for diabetes), but also have large sections with dubious information on vaccines."

After Patrick Swayze died in 2009, Adams posted an article in which he remarked that Swayze, in dying, "joins many other celebrities who have been recently killed by pharmaceuticals or chemotherapy." Commentators of Adams' article on Patrick Swayze included bloggers such as David Gorski and Phil Plait, the latter of whom called Adams' commentary "obnoxious and loathsome." When Angelina Jolie underwent a double mastectomy in May 2013 because she had a mutation in the BRCA1 gene, Adams stated that "Countless millions of women carry the BRCA1 gene and never express breast cancer because they lead healthy, anti-cancer lifestyles based on smart nutrition, exercise, sensible sunlight exposure and avoidance of cancer-causing chemicals." Gorski called the article "vile" and noted that Adams had written similarly themed articles about the death of Michael Jackson, Tony Snow, and Tim Russert.

In February 2014, Brian Palmer, writing in the Daily Herald of Arlington Heights, Illinois, criticized the site's promotion of alternative medicine treatments, such as bathing in Himalayan salt and eating Hijiki seaweed, and referred to the claims Natural News made about their efficacy as "preposterous." In August 2014, Nathanael Johnson, writing for Grist, dismissed Natural News as "simply not credible" and as "nothing but a conspiracy-theory site."

On August 11, 2014, Natural News published a blog post promoting a homeopathic treatment for Ebola, which was met with harsh criticism from several commentators, and was taken down later that day. In a statement on the article, NaturalNews said that the blogger who posted the article, Ken Oftedal, was "under review" and that they did not condone anyone interacting with Ebola. However, as of August 20, 2014, the site was still featuring an article written by Adams promoting the use of herbal medicines to treat Ebola. In an article about "fake Ebola cures", Adams was criticized for arguing that herbs could prove effective as an Ebola treatment. Natural News was among the pseudoscience platforms which promoted hoaxes about the 2014 Ebola epidemic, including claims that an infected woman was found in Atlanta and that Ebola was a bioweapon.

On December 8, 2016, Michael V. LeVine, writing in Business Insider, criticized the site as part of a scientific fake news epidemic: "Snake-oil salesmen have pushed false cures since the dawn of medicine, and now websites like Natural News flood social media with dangerous anti-pharmaceutical, anti-vaccination and anti-GMO pseudoscience that puts millions at risk of contracting preventable illnesses."

On February 22, 2017, Google delisted about 140,000 pages on Natural News, removing it from search results. It was returned soon after. The following year, on March 3, 2018, YouTube removed Natural News' video channel for terms of service violations, effectively removing its library of videos from the site. The channel was subsequently reinstated and the videos returned. In June 2019, Facebook removed Natural News from its website for violating its policies against spam. Adams wrote on InfoWars that his site was "permanently banned" from Facebook, and on The Gateway Pundit that the ban was part of a conspiracy against his website.

A 2020 study by researchers from Northeastern, Harvard, Northwestern and Rutgers universities found that Natural News was among the top 5 most shared fake news domains in tweets related to COVID-19, the others being The Gateway Pundit, InfoWars, WorldNetDaily and Judicial Watch.

Notable claims 
In 2011, Adams posted a report on Natural News which stated that many blueberry food products did not contain real blueberries.

In 2013, Adams posted an article describing what he saw when he examined Chicken McNuggets under a microscope. He said in the article that the patterns he saw included "dark black hair-like structures" and a round algae-like object.

In July 2014, Adams compared media outlets that wrote positively about GMOs with Nazi Germany's propagandists, calling them, "Monsanto collaborators who have signed on to accelerate heinous crimes being committed against humanity under the false promise of 'feeding the world' with toxic GMOs."  He continued with a statement that he set in boldface: "that it is the moral right—and even the obligation—of human beings everywhere to actively plan and carry out the killing of those engaged in heinous crimes against humanity." A day after the post a website called "Monsanto Collaborator" appeared online which listed the names of scientists and journalists who allegedly collaborate with the bio industry; Adams denied creating the website claiming that Monsanto set up the website in order to frame him.

In 2019, Natural News falsely claimed that wind turbines contribute more to climate change than fossil fuels.

References

External links

 

9/11 conspiracy theorists
Alternative medicine publications
Conspiracist media
HIV/AIDS denialism
Pseudoscience
Fake news websites
Anti-vaccination media
Anti-vaccination in the United States
Websites with far-right material
American conservative websites
Climate change denial
Internet properties established in 2008
2008 establishments in the United States